Guenoc is a former settlement in Lake County, California.

Guenoc was founded in 1866. Its first store opened in 1866.

A post office operated at Guenoc from 1867 to 1880.

References

Former settlements in Lake County, California
Former populated places in California
Populated places established in 1866
1866 establishments in California